25 Number Ones is an album from country music artist Conway Twitty, released in 2004, comprising 25 songs on a single compact disc. The album reached number 29 on the U.S. Billboard country albums chart and features such hits as "Hello Darlin'" and "Tight Fittin' Jeans".

Track listing

Chart performance

References

2004 greatest hits albums
Conway Twitty albums
MCA Records compilation albums
Compilation albums of number-one songs